Whillock is a surname. Notable people with the surname include:

 H. W. Whillock (1904–1992), American politician
 Jack Whillock (1942–2021), American baseball player

See also
 Whitlock (surname)